Mamman Makama (born 23 November 1946) is a Nigerian sprinter. He competed in the men's 400 metres at the 1968 Summer Olympics.

References

1946 births
Living people
Athletes (track and field) at the 1968 Summer Olympics
Athletes (track and field) at the 1972 Summer Olympics
Nigerian male sprinters
Olympic athletes of Nigeria
Athletes (track and field) at the 1970 British Commonwealth Games
Athletes (track and field) at the 1974 British Commonwealth Games
Commonwealth Games competitors for Nigeria
People from Abuja
20th-century Nigerian people